Peter Chrysologus (Petros Chrysologos, "Peter the Golden-worded"; c. 380 – c. 450) was Bishop of Ravenna from about 433 until his death. He is known as the “Doctor of Homilies” for the concise but theologically rich reflections he delivered during his time as the Bishop of Ravenna.

He is revered as a saint by the Roman Catholic Church and the Eastern Orthodox Church; he was declared a Doctor of the Church by Pope Benedict XIII in 1729.

Life
Peter was born in Imola, where Cornelius, bishop of the Roman Catholic Diocese of Imola, baptized him, educated him, and ordained him a deacon. He was made an archdeacon through the influence of Emperor Valentinian III. Pope Sixtus III appointed Peter as Bishop of Ravenna circa 433, apparently rejecting the candidate whom the people of the city of Ravenna elected. At that time Ravenna was the capital of the West, and there are indications that Ravenna held the rank of metropolitan before this time.

The traditional account, as recorded in the Roman Breviary, is that Sixtus had a vision of Pope Peter the Apostle and Apollinaris of Ravenna, the first bishop of that see, who showed Peter, a young man, the next Bishop of Ravenna. When a group from Ravenna arrived, including Cornelius and his archdeacon Peter from Imola, Sixtus recognized Peter as the young man in his vision and consecrated him as a bishop.

People knew Peter Chrysologus, the Doctor of Homilies, for his very simple and short but inspired sermons, for he was afraid of fatiguing the attention of his hearers. His piety and zeal won universal admiration. After hearing oratory of his first homily as bishop, Roman Empress Galla Placidia supposedly gave him the surname Chrysologus, meaning "golden-worded." His sermons are historically significant in that they reveal Christian life in fifth-century Ravenna. The Emperor's mother, Galla Placidia, patronized many projects of Bishop Peter.

In his extant homilies, Bishop Peter explained Biblical texts briefly and concisely.  He also condemned Arianism and Monophysitism as heresies and explained the Apostles' Creed, the mystery of the Incarnation, and other topics in simple and clear language. He dedicated a series of homilies to John the Baptist and the Blessed Virgin Mary.  Peter advocated daily reception of Eucharist. He urged his listeners to confide in the forgiveness offered through Christ.  His surviving works attest to the Catholic Church's traditional beliefs about Mary's perpetual virginity, the penitential value of Lent, Christ's Eucharistic presence, and the primacy of St. Peter and his successors. He shared the confidence of Pope Leo I the Great (440-461), another Doctor of the Church.

A synod held in Constantinople in 448 condemned Eutyches for Monophysitism; Eutyches then appealed to Peter Chrysologus but failed in his endeavour to win the support of the Bishop. The Acts of the Council of Chalcedon (451) preserves the text of letter of Peter Chrysologus in response to Eutyches; Peter admonishes Eutyches to accept the ruling of the synod and to give obedience to the Bishop of Rome as the successor of Peter the Apostle.

Archbishop Felix of Ravenna in the early eighth century collected and preserved 176 of his homilies.  Various authors edited and translated these works into numerous languages.

Death and veneration
St Peter died circa or after 450 during a visit to Imola, the town of his birth. Older reference books say he died on 2 December, but a more recent interpretation of the ninth-century "Liber Pontificalis Ecclesiae Ravennatis" indicated that he died on 31 July.

When in 1729 he was declared a Doctor of the Church, his feast day, not already included in the Tridentine Calendar, was inserted in the General Roman Calendar for celebration on 4 December. In 1969 his feast was moved to 30 July, as close as possible to the day of his death, 31 July, the feast day of Ignatius of Loyola.

A contemporary portrait of Peter Chrysologus, found in the mosaics of the Church of San Giovanni Evangelista in Ravenna, depicts him among the members of the eastern and western imperial family, showing his extraordinary influence.

Works

While there are not many translations of his writings, some have begun to appear in recent years. Included are selected sermons translated by William Palardy and published by the Catholic University of America Press in 2014, as well as a recent 2020 volume from Routledge also translating a number of his sermons, translated by David Vincent Meconi Jr.

See also
 Saint Peter Chrysologus, patron saint archive

References

Bibliography
 Otto Bardenhewer, Patrology, tr. Shanan, pp. 526 ff.
 Dapper, Der hl. Petrus von Ravenna Chrysologus, Posen, 1871
 Looshorn, Der hl. Petrus Chrysologus und seine Schriflen in Zeitschrift f. kathol. Theol., III, 1879, pp. 238 ff.
 Wayman, Zu Petrus Chrysologus in Philologus, LV (1896), pp. 464 ff.
 San Pietro Crisologo, Sermoni, two volumes, Città Nuova, Roma 1997

External links
St. Peter Chrysologus
Patron Saints Index: Saint Peter Chrysologus
Saint of the Day: 30 July

380 births
450 deaths
5th-century Italian bishops
5th-century Christian saints
Bishops of Ravenna
Church Fathers
Doctors of the Church
Italian saints
People from Imola
5th-century Latin writers
Latin letter writers